Tilney and Tylney are surnames of English origin. They may refer to:

People 

Agnes Tilney (AKA Agnes Howard, Duchess of Norfolk, 14771545), English noblewoman
Colin Tilney (born 1933), harpsichordist, fortepianist and teacher
 Edmund Tylney (AKA Edmund Tilney, 15361610), courtier to Elizabeth I of England, and Master of the Revels
Elizabeth Tilney, Countess of Surrey (before 14451497), English heiress and lady-in-waiting to two queens
 Sir Frederick Tilney (died 1445) Lord of Ashwellthorpe, Norfolk, and Boston, Lincolnshire
John Tilney (190794), British businessman and politician
Robert Tilney (before 1943after 1962), British Army officer who served during World War II
William S. Tilney (born 1939), American public official, lawyer and diplomat

Places 
Thorpe Tilney, hamlet in the county of Lincolnshire, England
Tilney All Saints, civil parish in the English county of Norfolk
Tilney St Lawrence, village and civil parish in the English county of Norfolk

Business 
Tilney (company)

Literature
Henry Tilney (Northanger Abbey)

See also
Athelney
Thilmany
Tillenay
Tylney

Surnames of English origin